Castelar is a city in Morón Partido (county), Buenos Aires Province, Argentina, some 30 km west of the nation's capital, the autonomous city of Buenos Aires. It forms part of the Greater Buenos Aires metropolitan area.

Castelar is the westernmost city of the Morón Partido, and borders on Ituzaingó Partido.

Climate

Economy
The Sero electric factory is located in Castelar.

Notable residents
Daniel Guerrero - television and film actor, radio announcer and television show host

See also
2013 Castelar train crash

References

External links

  Castelar railway station on Google Maps
 Castelar Digital
 Historia y actualidad de Moron, Argentina

Morón Partido
Populated places in Buenos Aires Province
Cities in Argentina